The 18th Street station was a station on the demolished IRT Sixth Avenue Line in Manhattan, New York City. It had two tracks and two side platforms. It was served by trains from the IRT Sixth Avenue Line and opened in 1892. It closed on December 4, 1938, and was not replaced with a subway station on the IND Sixth Avenue Line. However, one block north of the station there was a 19th Street station on the Hudson and Manhattan Railroad that operated between 1908 and 1954. The next southbound stop was 14th Street. The next northbound stop was 23rd Street.

References

IRT Sixth Avenue Line stations
Railway stations in the United States opened in 1892
Railway stations closed in 1938
Former elevated and subway stations in Manhattan
1938 disestablishments in New York (state)

Sixth Avenue
1892 establishments in New York (state)